Mwila Phiri (born 29 August 1994) is a Zambian footballer who plays as a midfielder for ZESCO United F.C. and the Zambia national football team.

Career

International
Phiri made his senior international debut on 7 November 2015, coming on as an 84th-minute substitute for Conlyde Luchanga in a 4-3 penalty defeat to Namibia. He notched his first international goal two months later, scoring the winner in a 2-1 victory over Angola.

Career statistics

International

International Goals
Scores and results list Zambia's goal tally first.

References

External links

1994 births
Living people
Zambian footballers
Zambia international footballers
Green Eagles F.C. players
Lusaka Dynamos F.C. players
ZESCO United F.C. players
Association football midfielders
Zambia A' international footballers
2016 African Nations Championship players